The Congo women's national basketball team is the women's national basketball team of the Republic of the Congo. It is administered by the Fédération Congolaise de Basketball.

See also 
 Republic of the Congo women's national under-19 basketball team
 Republic of the Congo women's national under-17 basketball team
 Republic of the Congo women's national 3x3 team

References

External links
Republic of Congo Basketball Records at FIBA Archive

Women's national basketball teams
Basketball in the Republic of the Congo
Basketball teams in the Republic of the Congo
basketball